Charaxes vansoni, the Van Son's emperor, is a butterfly of the family Nymphalidae. It is found in southern Africa.

The wingspan is 48–56 mm in males and 50–60 mm in females.

Description
In males of Charaxes vansoni the two subapical spots on the forewing upperside are blue,
whereas in Charaxes phaeus, with which it is often sympatric, they are white and the ground colour of the hindwing underside is pale coppery brown, with the silvery sheen comparatively reduced, extending only from the base along the costa and cell. In females of Charaxes vansoni the median band on the upperside may be white, greenish white or bluish. The spots on the forewing upperside vary from white to orange-ochre

Biology
It flies year-round, with peaks from February to May and in spring. The habitat is dry savanna.

The larvae feed on Peltophorum africanum.

Taxonomy
Charaxes vansoni is a member of the large species group Charaxes etheocles

References 

Henning, S.F. (1979) History of some recently described Charaxes with the description and life history of Charaxes vansoni van Someren (Lepidoptera: Nymphalidae). Entomologist's Record and Journal of Variation 91 (7-8):177-184. Explanation of status as full species
Van Someren, V.G.L., 1969 Revisional notes on African Charaxes (Lepidoptera: Nymphalidae). Part V. Bulletin of the British Museum (Natural History) (Entomology)75-166. page 129 description as female form of Charaxes viola phaeus page 137 Plate 21 figs 199, 200
Van Someren, V.G.L., 1975 Revisional notes on African Charaxes, Palla and Euxanthe (Lepidoptera: Nymphalidae). Part X. Bulletin of the British Museum of Natural History (Entomology) 32 (3):65-136  page 108 sp. nov.

External links
 Charaxes vansoni images at BOLD

vansoni
Butterflies described in 1975